Mikołaj Jan Prażmowski (1617 – 15 April 1673) was the archbishop of Gniezno and primate of Poland from 1666. He was Interrex from 1668 to 1669.

He was born in Prażmów. He was bishop of Łuck from 1659, and bishop of Warmia from 1664. He was previously chancellor in 1658-1666 Grand Crown Secretary, Crown Deputy Chancellors from 1658, Grand Secretary of the Crown, Grand Secretary of the Crown from 1652. He died in Ujazdów

References

External links
 Virtual tour Gniezno Cathedral 
List of Primates of Poland 

Polish bishops
History of Poland
Gniezno
1617 births
1673 deaths
Crown Vice-Chancellors